Tony Giammalva (born April 21, 1958) is a former professional tennis player from the United States. 

During his career he won 4 doubles titles and achieved a career-high doubles ranking of World No. 32 in 1985.  His best singles ranking was reached in February 1981, at World No. 70.

Giammalva's father Sam played top-level tennis  as well, participating on two Davis Cup winning teams for the United States.  Tony's younger brother Sammy Jr. was also a touring pro.

Career finals

Doubles (4 titles, 5 runner-ups)

External links
 
 

American male tennis players
American people of Italian descent
Tennis players from Houston
Trinity Tigers men's tennis players
1958 births
Living people